Events from the year 1885 in Michigan.

Office holders

State office holders
 Governor of Michigan: Russell A. Alger (Republican)
 Lieutenant Governor of Michigan: Archibald Buttars (Republican)
 Michigan Attorney General: Jacob J. Van Riper/Moses Taggart
 Michigan Secretary of State: Harry A. Conant (Republican)
 Speaker of the Michigan House of Representatives: Newcomb Clark (Republican)
 Chief Justice, Michigan Supreme Court:

Mayors of major cities

 Mayor of Detroit: Stephen Benedict Grummond 
 Mayor of Grand Rapids: John L. Curtis
 Mayor of Saginaw: John S. Estabrook

Federal office holders

 U.S. Senator from Michigan: Omar D. Conger (Republican)
 U.S. Senator from Michigan: Thomas W. Palmer (Republican) 
 House District 1: William C. Maybury (Democrat)
 House District 2: Nathaniel B. Eldredge (Democrat)
 House District 3: Edward S. Lacey (Republican)/James O'Donnell (Republican)
 House District 4: George L. Yaple (Democrat)/Julius C. Burrows (Republican)
 House District 5: Julius Houseman (Democrat)/Charles C. Comstock (Democrat)
 House District 6: Edwin B. Winans (Democrat)
 House District 7: Ezra C. Carleton (Democrat)
 House District 8: Roswell G. Horr (Republican)/Timothy E. Tarsney (Democrat)
 House District 9: Byron M. Cutcheon (Republican)
 House District 10: Herschel H. Hatch (Republican)/Spencer O. Fisher (Democrat)
 House District 11: Edward Breitung (Republican)/Seth C. Moffatt (Republican)

Population

Sports

Baseball
 1885 Detroit Wolverines season – Under managers Charlie Morton and Bill Watkins, the Detroit baseball team finished in sixth place in the National League with a 41–67 record. The team's statistical leaders included Sam Thompson with a .303 batting average and seven home runs, Charlie Bennett with 60 RBIs, Stump Wiedman with 14 pitching wins, and Lady Baldwin with a 1.86 earned run average. 
 1885 Michigan Wolverines baseball season - The Wolverines compiled a 2–1 record. John Hibbard was the team captain.

American football
 1885 Michigan Wolverines football team – The Wolverines compiled a 3–0 record and outscored their opponents by a combined score of 82 to 2. The team captain was Horace Greely Prettyman.

Chronology of events

January

February

April
 April 14 - A bill passed the Michigan Senate providing for the creation of the Michigan Mining School, later renamed Michigan Technological University. The bill became law effective May 1

May

June

July
 July - A strike by mill workers in the Saginaw Valley shut down 98 mills, idling 8,000 men. The strike focused on demands for a 10-hour work day.

August
 August 16 - St. Mary Catholic Church in Detroit's Greektown was dedicated.

November

December
 December 1–2 - Police were called to restore order as parishioners at St. Albert's Polish Cathoich Church in Detroit protested the removal of their pastor, Father Kolaskinski, by Bishop Borgess. One man was shot to death on December 24 in continued unrest.
 December 3 - The Barnum Wire and Iron Works in Detroit was completely destroyed by fire, a blaze the Detroit Free Press called "the most dangerous conflagration that has occurred in Detroit for many years".
 December 16 - The murder of Frank Knoch and his family was discovered in the Springwells section of Detroit. The gruesome murders shocked the city and remained a focus of the news for days thereafter.

Births

 March 6 - Ring Lardner, sports columnist and short story writer, in Niles, Michigan
 August 15 - Edna Ferber, Pulitzer Prize winning novelist and playwright (So Big, Show Boat, Cimarron, Giant), in Kalamazoo, Michigan

Deaths
 June 15 - Petosegay, merchant and fur trader and namesake of Petoskey, Michigan and the Petoskey stone, in Petoskey

See also
 History of Michigan
 History of Detroit

References